Karad Airport  is in the Satara district of Maharashtra state in India. 
Its airstrip was built in 1955 by the Public Works Department to facilitate the Koyna dam project.
The airport is currently used for general aviation and piloting.

It currently covers 65 acres; the acquisition of more than 100 acres has been proposed.
Runway 10/28 is 1280 metres long and 30 metres wide with a 60-by-60-metre apron.
No navigational aids or night landing facilities are available on the airstrip.

Future Plans
The State run Maharashtra Airport Development Company (MADC) plans to extend the 1,250 metres airstrip by another 1,500m and widen it by 150m. 
The Airports Authority of India (AAI) has submitted its technical feasibility report to the MADC for examination which in turn has handed it over to the Maharashtra Government for final approval.

References

Airports in Maharashtra
Satara district
Karad
1955 establishments in Bombay State
Airports established in 1955
20th-century architecture in India